Zdravinje may refer to:

 Zdravinje (Kruševac), village in the municipality of Kruševac, Serbia
 Zdravinje (Prokuplje), village in the municipality of Prokuplje, Serbia